Saint Emerentiana was a Roman virgin and martyr, who lived around the start of the 4th century. Her feast day is 23 January.

Legend
According to the legend of St. Agnes of Rome, Emerentiana was her foster sister. St. Agnes was a rich Roman heiress who was martyred after refusing an engagement due to her Christian religion. Emerentiana's mother was the wet nurse and nanny of Saint Agnes.  

A few days after Agnes' death, Emerentiana, who was a catechumen still learning about Christianity before being officially baptised, went to the tomb to pray and was suddenly attacked by the pagans. Having professed her faith and acknowledged her relationship to Agnes, she was stoned to death by the crowd. In this way, she can be considered to have undergone a baptism of desire, or a baptism of blood, according to the tenets of the Catholic Church.

Veneration
There was a real Roman martyr named Emerentiana, whose cultus is very ancient, as attested by the martyrologies of Jerome, Bede, and others, but not even the date of her death is known. Her feast day is 23 January. Formerly, in the martyrology of Jerome, her feast was commemorated on 16 September. Her cult has been confined to local calendars since 1969. 

She is represented as a young girl who either has stones in her lap and lilies in her hand, or as being stoned to death by a mob. Her tomb is in the church of Sant'Agnese fuori le mura in Rome. An altar dedicated to her with a marble relief by Ercole Ferrata depicting her martyrdom is in Sant'Agnese in Agone.

She is invoked against colic and stomach ache.

Popular culture
Emerentiana had a tiny cameo role in Cardinal Nicholas Wiseman's novel, Fabiola, where she is seen mourning for Agnes right after the latter's martyrdom.

See also
 Calendar of saints
 January 23 (Eastern Orthodox liturgics)
 Roman Martyrology

References

External links

Patron saint index

Year of birth unknown
304 deaths
4th-century Christian martyrs
4th-century Christian saints
4th-century Roman women
Ante-Nicene Christian female saints
Burials at Sant'Agnese fuori le mura
Deaths by stoning